"Whatever U Want" is a single by American rapper Consequence featuring fellow American rapper Kanye West and American singer John Legend. The music video, directed by Hype Williams, was released in October 2009.

Remixes
The official remix was released by Consequence on November 18, 2009 as "The G.O.O.D. Music Remix", featuring Kid Cudi, Common, Big Sean, John Legend and Kanye West. Another official remix was released on January 12, 2010 as "The Bad Boy Remix", featuring Diddy and The LOX. On his 2010 mixtape Movies on Demand, Consequence included “Whatever U Want (G.O.O.D. vs. Bad Megamix)” as the thirteenth track.

Music video
Consequence, West and Legend traveled to Miami on the day of the song's release to film the Hype Williams-directed music video for it. The video was officially released on October 13, 2009.

Charts

Release history

References

External links

2009 singles
2009 songs
Consequence (rapper) songs
GOOD Music singles
John Legend songs
Kanye West songs
Music videos directed by Hype Williams
Song articles with missing songwriters
Song recordings produced by Kanye West
Songs written by Consequence (rapper)
Universal Motown Records singles
Songs written by Kanye West
Songs written by John Legend
Song recordings produced by Jeff Bhasker
Songs written by Jeff Bhasker